The Government of Malta is the executive branch of the Republic of Malta. It is made up of the Cabinet and the Parliamentary Secretaries. The Prime Minister is appointed by the President of Malta, with the President making their decision based on the situation within the Maltese parliament. The Prime Minister is responsible for assigning departments of government to Permanent Secretaries. The President of Malta also appoints the rest of the cabinet with the assent of the Prime Minister of Malta.

See also
Cabinet of Malta
List of Maltese governments

References

 
European governments